Hamid Lolayi (born  December 25, 1955 in Tehran, Iran) is an Iranian actor and comedian. He started his acting career in 1979.

Filmography

Cinema
 3 Bigane
 Kaleske
 consert Rooye Ab
 Age Mitooni Mano Bokosh
 Age Mitooni Mano Begir
 Ghaede Bazi 
 Chand Migiri Gerye Koni
Babaye Ejbaari
Shadi Haye Zendegi
 Raghse Sheitan
 Kelide Ezdevaj
 Marde Avazi

Series 
 Tweezers (2020)
 SMS from another World (2008)
 Char Khooneh (2007)
 Under the City's Skin (2001-2002)

References

External links
 

Living people
1955 births
Iranian male television actors
Iranian male film actors
Iranian male stage actors
Male actors from Tehran
Crystal Simorgh for Best Supporting Actor winners